Emanuel Theodore Bronner (born Emanuel Heilbronner, February 1, 1908 – March 7, 1997) was the maker of Dr. Bronner's Magic Soaps. He used product labels to promote his moral and religious ideas, including a belief in the goodness and unity of humanity.

History 
Bronner was born in Heilbronn, Germany, to the Heilbronner family of soap makers. He immigrated to the United States in 1929, dropping "Heil" from his name because of its associations with Nazism. He became a naturalized citizen of the United States in 1936. As his family was Jewish, he pleaded with his parents to emigrate with him for fear of the then-ascendant Nazi Party, but they refused. His last contact with his parents was in the form of a censored postcard saying, "You were right. —Your loving father." His parents were murdered in the Holocaust.

Career 
He started his business making products such as castile soap by hand in his home. The product labels are crowded with statements of Bronner's philosophy, which he called "All-One-God-Faith" and the "Moral ABC", both of which he included on the label of every soap bottle he produced.  Many of Bronner's references came from Jewish and Christian sources, such as the Shema and the Beatitudes; others from writers such as Rudyard Kipling and Thomas Paine. On his labels, he referred to the Jewish sage Hillel the Elder as "Rabbi Hillel" and to Jesus Christ as "Rabbi Jesus." The labels became famous for their idiosyncratic style, including hyphens to join long strings of words and the liberal use of exclamation marks.

In 1946, while promoting his "Moral ABC" at the University of Chicago, Bronner was arrested for refusing to leave the dean's office, despite the fact he was invited to the campus to lecture by a local student group, and then was committed to the Elgin Mental Health Center, a mental hospital in Elgin, Illinois, from which he escaped after shock treatments. Bronner believed those shock treatments brought about his eventual blindness.

After moving his family several times, he settled in Escondido, California, where eventually his soap-making operation grew into a small factory. At his death in 1997, it produced more than a million bottles of soap and other products per year, but was still not mechanized. The firm has been the subject of many published articles and has supported many charitable causes.

Legacy
After Bronner's death, his family has continued to run the business. His grandson David Bronner is currently CEO.

His life was the subject of a 2007 documentary film, Dr. Bronner's Magic Soapbox, which premiered on the Sundance TV channel, on 3 July 2007.

References

External links 
 Dr. Bronner's Magic Soaps Home Page
 Dr. Bronner's Magic Soapbox, a documentary film
 "The Undiluted Genius of Dr. Bronner's" (2012-04-03) in Inc. magazine

Bronner, E. H.
Bronner, E. H.
American people of German-Jewish descent
American blind people
German people of Jewish descent
People from Escondido, California
People from Heilbronn
20th-century American businesspeople
German emigrants to the United States
American pacifists
Activists from California
20th-century American philosophers